The 2016–17 Dallas Stars season was the 50th season for the National Hockey League franchise that was established on June 5, 1967, and 24th season since the franchise relocated from Minnesota prior to the start of the 1993–94 NHL season. The Stars missed the playoffs, finishing 11th in the Western Conference.

Standings

Schedule and results

Pre-season

Regular season

Player statistics
Final stats

Skaters

Goaltenders

†Denotes player spent time with another team before joining the Stars.  Stats reflect time with the Stars only.
‡Traded mid-season
Bold/italics denotes franchise record

Transactions 
The Stars have been involved in the following transactions during the 2016–17 season:

Trades

Free agents acquired

Free agents lost

Claimed via waivers

Lost via waivers

Lost via retirement

Player signings

Draft picks

Below are the Dallas Stars' selections at the 2016 NHL Entry Draft, to be held on June 24–25, 2016 at the First Niagara Center in Buffalo.

Notes

 The Dallas Stars' second-round pick went to the Calgary Flames as the result of a trade on February 29, 2016 that sent Kris Russell to Dallas in exchange for Jyrki Jokipakka, Brett Pollock and this pick (being conditional at time of the trade). The condition – Calgary will receive a second-round pick in 2016 if Dallas fails to qualify for the 2016 Western Conference Final – was converted on May 11, 2016.
 The Dallas Stars' third-round pick went to the Buffalo Sabres as the result of a trade on February 11, 2015 that sent Jhonas Enroth to Dallas in exchange for Anders Lindback and this pick (being conditional at the time of the trade). The condition – Buffalo will receive a third-round pick in 2016 if Enroth wins fewer than four playoff games for the Stars in 2015 – was converted on April 6, 2015 when the Stars were eliminated from playoff contention.
 The San Jose Sharks' third-round pick went to the Dallas Stars as the result of a trade on November 21, 2014 that sent Brenden Dillon to San Jose in exchange for Jason Demers and this pick.
 The Arizona Coyotes' fifth-round pick went to the Dallas Stars as the result of a trade on June 16, 2016 that sent Alex Goligoski to Arizona in exchange for this pick.
 The Dallas Stars' seventh-round pick went to the Tampa Bay Lightning as the result of a trade on June 27, 2015 that sent Anaheim's seventh-round pick in 2015 to Edmonton in exchange for this pick.
Edmonton previously acquired this pick as the result of a trade on July 5, 2013 that sent Shawn Horcoff to Dallas in exchange for Philip Larsen and this pick.

References

Dallas Stars seasons
Dallas Stars
Dallas Stars
Dallas Stars
2010s in Dallas
2016 in Texas
2017 in Texas